Samuel Wardell Williams (February 7, 1851 – August 5, 1913) was an American judge who is best known for being the Populist Party's nominee for Vice President of the United States in the election of 1908.

Biography
Williams was born in Mount Carmel, Illinois in 1851. At some point, he moved to Indiana and became a judge.

In 1904, he was one of the candidates for the Populist Party's nomination for President and served as chairman of the Populist Committee. He came in third place at the convention, receiving 45 votes on the first ballot. Thomas E. Watson received 698 votes, and William V. Allen received 319.

Williams served in the Indiana House of Representatives and was a Democrat at the time of his election to the Indiana General Assembly.

In 1908, Williams was the vice presidential nominee of the Populist Party, running with Thomas E. Watson. They received 28,862 votes (0.19%), performing best in Watson's home state of Georgia, where they received upwards of 12%.

Williams died of appendicitis on August 5, 1913, in Vincennes, Indiana, at the age of 62. He is buried at Greenlawn Cemetery in Vincennes.

References

External links
 

1851 births
1913 deaths
19th-century American judges
20th-century American judges
Illinois Populists
Indiana Populists
Democratic Party members of the Indiana House of Representatives
Mount Carmel, Illinois
People from Mount Carmel, Illinois
People from Vincennes, Indiana
1908 United States vice-presidential candidates
Deaths from appendicitis